APALA or Apala could refer to:

Apala, a music genre associated with the Yoruba people of Nigeria
Apala Majumdar, British mathematician
Asian Pacific American Labor Alliance, a trade union organization
Asian Pacific American Librarians Association, an affiliate of the American Library Association
Conocybe apala, a basidiomycete fungus and a member of the genus Conocybe